Colle Umberto is a comune (municipality) in the Province of Treviso in the Italian region Veneto, located about  north of Venice and about  north of Treviso.

Colle Umberto borders the following municipalities: Cappella Maggiore, Conegliano, Cordignano, Godega di Sant'Urbano, San Fior, Vittorio Veneto.

The town's most visited place is the Villa Verecondi Scortecci owned by an old upper-class Venetian family.

San Martino

The frazione of San Martino  was the birthplace of Ottavio Bottecchia, the first Italian to win the Tour de France in both 1924 and 1925, but he died mysteriously at the height of career during a training ride in Friuli, at Trasaghis. There is a local move to create a museum to him.

Twin towns

The town is twinned with the following:
 San Lawrenz, Gozo.
La Balme-de-Sillingy, France

References

External links
 Official website

Cities and towns in Veneto